may refer to:

Places
 Miyajima, another name for the Japanese island Itsukushima
 Miyajima, Hiroshima, a former town on this island, merged into Hatsukaichi, Hiroshima in 2005
 Itsukushima Shrine, a Shinto shrine on the island of Itsukushima, often referred to as "Miyajima"

People with the surname
 , Japanese javelin thrower
 , Japanese skeleton racer
 , Japanese former volleyball player
 , Japanese manga artist
 , Japanese sculptor and installation artist 

Japanese-language surnames